1-Aminoethanol is an organic compound with the formula CHCH(NH)OH.  It is classified as an alkanolamine.  Specifically, it is a structural isomer of 2-aminoethanol (ethanolamine).  These two compounds differ in the position of the amino group. Since the central carbon atom in 1-aminoethanol has four different substituents, the compound has two stereoisomers.  Unlike 2-aminoethanol, which is of considerable importance in commerce, 1-aminoethanol is not encountered as a pure material and is mainly of theoretical interest.

1-Aminoethanol exists in a solution of acetaldehyde and aqueous ammonia.

1-Aminoethanol is suggested as intermediate in Strecker reaction of alanine synthesis.

1-Aminoethanol was first prepared in 1833 by the German chemist Johann Wolfgang Döbereiner; its empirical formula was first determined by the German chemist Justus von Liebig in 1835.  The structure of 1-aminoethanol remained unproven until 1877, when the German-Italian chemist Robert Schiff showed that the structure was CHCH(OH)NH.

References

Primary alcohols
Amines